Hunter Brothers is a Canadian country music group from Shaunavon, Saskatchewan composed of brothers Luke, J.J., Ty, Brock and Dusty Hunter. They signed with Open Road Recordings and released their debut single, "El Dorado", in February 2016. It debuted on the Billboard Canada Country chart in March 2016. The band earned their first Top 10 single at Canadian country radio with their hit "Born and Raised". In 2019, their single "Lost" became their first #1 hit.

Personal life
The Hunter Brothers are a Canadian country band consisting of 5 brothers from Shaunavon, Saskatchewan: Luke, J.J., Ty, Brock, and Dusty. Their parents are Lorne and Norma Hunter, and their uncle Jim Hunter is a Canadian Olympic skier.

These brothers grew up farming in the Canadian prairies. They spent their summers singing in churches across the country. In the Winter, they were heavily involved in the hockey community. Some of the brothers even played for some major league teams.

When the 5 brothers are at home working on the farm, they often pass the time in the field by re-writing well known songs with words that are relevant to farming culture, performing them over their CB radios. They often share these songs online through their various social media platforms.

Hockey Careers
Four of the five brothers played junior ice hockey and three played in the professional minor leagues. J.J., Dustin, and Luke each played forward, while Brock and Ty were defencemen. Ty played rep hockey before suffering a broken femur. The remaining four brothers all sustained injuries of various kinds and returned home to continue farming with their parents on their family's 20,000 acre farm.

J.J. Hunter played three seasons in Western Hockey League with the Kelowna Rockets and Prince Albert Raiders; he attended six NHL training camps (1999 Detroit Red Wings, 2001-2006 Edmonton Oilers) and was under contract with the Edmonton Oilers for 5 seasons playing NHL pre-season games and five years in their farm system. Altogether, he played 6 years of pro-hockey including parts of six seasons in the American Hockey League with the Hamilton Bulldogs, Toronto Roadrunners, Edmonton Road Runners, Toronto Marlies and Manitoba Moose; and parts of four season in the ECHL with the Toledo Storm and Columbus Cottonmouths.

Dustin Hunter played junior hockey with the Melville Millionaires in the Saskatchewan Junior Hockey League, then one professional season split between the Oklahoma City Blazers and San Angelo Saints in the Central Hockey League before his career was abruptly ended due to a severe eye injury.
 
Luke Hunter played five seasons in the WHL with the Swift Current Broncos, and one season each with the Wichita Thunder in the CHL, and the University of Calgary Dinos men's ice hockey team in the CIS. His career also came to a halt due to an eye injury.
 
Brock Hunter played junior hockey in the AJHL with the Drumheller Dragons, and the Fort McMurray Oil Barons before finishing up his career with the Kindersley Klippers in the SJHL.

All the brothers joined forces together when they returned home to play for the same hometown hockey team, the Shaunavon Badgers in the WMHL.

Music career

Early years
Music has always brought these 5 brothers together. When they were younger, they spent their time mirroring music videos from other artists, and learning to become performers. What emerged was an organic pop-country sound. The Hunter Brothers quickly become known for their harmonies and stage presence.

2016-2018: Getaway
In 2016, the brothers started recording a collection of songs with their label Open Road Recordings. On February 5, 2016 they released their debut single “El Dorado” to country radio which helped put this new band on the map within the Canadian country music industry. "El Dorado" was co-produced by Brad Rempel of Canadian country band High Valley along with Seth Mosley and Mike "X" O'Connor

“El Dorado” debuted on the Billboard Canada Country charts in March 2016, and reach number 24 on the chart.

In the Spring of 2017, the Hunter Brothers released their debut album Getaway. This album included two singles that earned them their first two songs that entered the top 10 on the Billboard charts: “Born and Raised”, and “Those Were the Nights”.

Their single "Born and Raised" from their Getaway album was selected as the official anthem for the 2018 IIHF World Junior Hockey Tournament. “Born and Raised” also won Saskatchewan Music Award for Single of the Year.

After the release of “El Dorado”, the Hunter Brothers were nominated for four Saskatchewan Country Music Association Awards, and won for both Group of the Year, and Emerging Artist categories.

2019-present: State of Mind and Been a Minute
In January 2019, they released their sophomore album State of Mind. The record showcases the brothers’ talent and growth. The first single from the record “Lost” has been certified Gold in Canada and became their first #1 single at Canadian Country Radio. “Lost” was also awarded Single of the Year at the 2019 Saskatchewan Music Awards. The album also included the singles, “Northern Lights” and “Silver Lining”.

In 2019, their album State of Mind was the number one selling country album in Canada for four consecutive weeks and has had over 10 million streams worldwide. Earlier in 2019, the Hunter Brothers joined country superstars Paul Brandt, Jess Moskaluke and High Valley for The Journey Tour on 26 dates across Canada. They debuted at CMA Fest in Nashville, and also landed three CCMA Award nominations.

The band was nominated for 2 JUNO Awards in 2020 for Country Album of the Year for their sophomore album State of Mind and Breakthrough Group of the Year.

On June 30, 2021, they released their third studio album Been a Minute, which included the singles "Hard Dirt" and "Been a Minute".

Discography

Studio albums

Singles

Other charted songs

Music videos

Awards and nominations

References

External links

 



Canadian country music groups
Musical groups established in 2016
Musical groups from Saskatchewan
Musical quintets
Open Road Recordings artists
Sibling musical groups
2016 establishments in Canada